The 55th Annual Tony Awards was held at Radio City Music Hall on June 3, 2001 and broadcast by CBS. "The First Ten" awards ceremony was telecast on PBS television . The event was co-hosted by Nathan Lane and Matthew Broderick. The Producers won 12 awards (every award it was eligible to win), breaking the 37-year-old record set by Hello, Dolly!  to become the most awarded show in Tony Awards history. Mel Brooks's win made him the eighth person to become an EGOT.

The ceremony
Presenters: Joan Allen, Dick Cavett, Kristin Chenoweth, Glenn Close, Dame Edna, Edie Falco, Kathleen Freeman, Gina Gershon, Heather Headley, Cherry Jones, Jane Krakowski, Marc Kudisch, Eric McCormack, Audra McDonald, Reba McEntire, Donna McKechnie, Brian Stokes Mitchell, Gwyneth Paltrow, Sarah Jessica Parker, Bernadette Peters, Natasha Richardson, Doris Roberts, Gary Sinise, Lily Tomlin, Henry Winkler, and three "Broadway Babies" (Meredith Patterson, Bryn Bowling, and Carol Bentley).

The musicals that performed were:
 A Class Act ("Follow Your Star"/"Better"/"Self Portrait"—Nancy Anderson, Jeff Blumenkrantz, Donna Bullock, Randy Graff, David Hibbard, Lonny Price, Patrick Quinn, Sara Ramirez);
 Bells Are Ringing ("I'm Going Back" -- Faith Prince);
 42nd Street ("42nd Street" -- David Elder, Kate Levering and company);
 Follies ("I'm Still Here" -- Polly Bergen with Louis Zorich, Jessica Leigh Brown, Colleen Dunn, Amy Heggins, and Wendy Waring);
 The Full Monty ("Let It Go"—John Ellison Conlee, Jason Danieley, André De Shields, Kathleen Freeman, Romain Fruge, Marcus Neville, Patrick Wilson, Thomas Fiss, and company);
 Jane Eyre ("Sirens" -- Marla Schaffel and James Barbour);
 The Producers, the new Mel Brooks Musical ("Along Came Bialy" -- Roger Bart, Gary Beach, Matthew Broderick, Cady Huffman, Nathan Lane, Brad Oscar, and company); and
 The Rocky Horror Show ("Time Warp" -- Dick Cavett, Lea Delaria, Jerrod Emick, Kristen Lee Kelly, Alice Ripley, Daphne Rubin-Vega, Tom Hewitt, Raul Esparza, Sebastian LaCause, and company).

Plays were also presented:
 The Invention of Love, introduced by playwright Tom Stoppard. Montage with voice-over by Richard Easton.
 King Hedley II, introduced by playwright August Wilson. Excerpt performed by Viola Davis and Brian Stokes Mitchell.
 One Flew Over the Cuckoo's Nest, introduced by Joan Allen. Excerpt performed by Gary Sinise, Amy Morton, Tim Sampson, Bruce McCarty, Jeanine Morick, and Afram Bill Williams.
 Proof, introduced by playwright David Auburn. Scene with Mary-Louise Parker and Ben Shenkman.
 The Tale of the Allergist's Wife, introduced by playwright Charles Busch. Scene with Linda Lavin, Tony Roberts, and Michele Lee.

Winners and nominees
Winners are in bold

Source: BroadwayWorld

Special awards
Regional Theatre Award
Victory Gardens Theater, Chicago, Illinois
Special Theatrical Event
Blast!
Special Lifetime Achievement Tony Award
Paul Gemignani
Tony Honors for Excellence in the Theatre
Betty Corwin and the Theatre on Film and Tape Archive of the New York Public Library for the Performing Arts
New Dramatists
Theatre World

Multiple nominations and awards

These productions had multiple nominations:

15 nominations: The Producers 
10 nominations: The Full Monty
9 nominations: 42nd Street
6 nominations: King Hedley II and Proof 
5 nominations: A Class Act, Follies, The Invention of Love and Jane Eyre 
4 nominations: The Rocky Horror Show 
3 nominations: Stones in His Pockets and The Tale of the Allergist's Wife  
2 nominations: The Adventures of Tom Sawyer, Bells Are Ringing, Betrayal, Blast!, Judgment at Nuremberg and One Flew Over the Cuckoo's Nest 

The following productions received multiple awards.

12 wins: The Producers 
3 wins: Proof
2 wins: 42nd Street and The Invention of Love

See also
 Drama Desk Awards
 2001 Laurence Olivier Awards – equivalent awards for West End theatre productions
 Obie Award
 New York Drama Critics' Circle
 Theatre World Award
 Lucille Lortel Awards

References

External links
 Official Site Tony Awards

Tony Awards ceremonies
2001 in theatre
2001 theatre awards
Tony
2001 in New York City
2000s in Manhattan
Television shows directed by Glenn Weiss